Chile is a country in South America.

Chile may also refer to:

Food
Chile pepper, the spicy fruit of plants in the genus Capsicum
Chile con queso, a dip and/or sauce made of melted cheese with roasted, chopped green chiles
Chile powder
Chile relleno, a battered, fried, cheese-stuffed green chile pepper
Chile sauce
New Mexico chile, a cultivar group of Capsicum annuum

Taxonomy of peoples and animals
Dingling, also known as Chile, an ancient Siberian people
Tiele people, a collection of mostly Turkic tribes, associated by the Chinese with the Dingling
Chile (brachiopod), a brachiopod genus

See also

Chiles (disambiguation)
Chili (disambiguation)
Chilly (disambiguation)